IPI or ipi may refer to:

Science and technology
 International Prognostic Index, a medical tool used in oncology to predict the outcome of lymphoma patients
 International Protein Index, a database covering information about the proteomes of humans, mice and other animals
 Integrated Pulmonary Index, a single value that describes the patient's respiratory status
 Inter-processor interrupt, a mechanism used between processors to maintain a sort of synchronization
 Intelligent Peripheral Interface, a technology for connecting storage devices to computers

Organizations
 Illinois Policy Institute, a libertarian think tank based in Illinois
 Image Permanence Institute, an organization dedicated to scientific research in the preservation of recorded information
 Imperial Pacific International, a former food manufacturer and gambling holding company
 Indian Political Intelligence, the latter name of the former intelligence organisation Indian Political Intelligence Office
 Institute for Private Investors, a private membership organization that provides peer-to-peer networking and investor education
 Institute of Photogrammetry and GeoInformation, a research institute, part of the consortium of institutes operating under the aegis of Leibniz University situated in Hannover, Germany
 International Peace Institute, a research and policy development institution
 International Press Institute, a journalism organization
 Inter-parliamentary institution, a type of parliamentary assembly
 Intellectual Property Institute (United Kingdom), a UK non-profit organization
 Irish Planning Institute, a professional body
 Swiss Federal Institute of Intellectual Property, a Swiss federal agency

People
 Ipi (vizier), Ancient Egyptian vizier
 Ipi Morea (born 1975), Papua New Guinean cricketer
 Faqir of Ipi (born 1897), Pashtun tribal leader from Waziristan

Other uses
 Industrial Production Index, an economic indicator
 Interested Parties Information, a unique identifying number assigned to each Interested Party in collective rights management
 International Payment Instruction a uniform European payment receipt
 Inwald Personality Inventory, a personality test
 Income protection insurance, an insurance policy paying benefits to policyholders who are unable to work due to illness or accident
 Ipili language (ISO 639 code: ipi)
 San Luis Airport (Colombia) (IATA code IPI)

See also
 Institute for Political and International Studies (IPIS)